The FuMP, or the Funny Music Project, is a website founded in 2007 which releases at least two (sometimes more) new comedy songs every week under a Creative Commons license, usually on Tuesdays and Fridays. Visitors are given a choice of downloading the songs for free as 128 kbps mp3s or purchasing a high-quality (320 kbps) mp3 for 99 cents. While core members include Sudden Death, Tom Smith, and Luke Ski, auxiliary members include Kyle Carrozza, Jonathan Coulton, Carla Ulbrich, Lemon Demon and the Brobdingnagian Bards.

In 2009 and 2013, it won the Parsec Award for Best Speculative Fiction Music Podcast.

Discography
Almost always, one album is released every other month, as a compilation of the songs released on the website during that time. As of August 11, 2022, there are 93 compilation albums available, along with 2 Christmas albums and 1 Halloween album. There have also been annual "Best of" albums released as free downloads, compiling 10 of the best songs published on the site during that year. There have also been live albums featuring recordings from FuMPFest, which occurred every year from 2014 up until 2021. There was no FuMPFest hosted in 2022, in person or online, due to budget issues.

References

External links
 

Music websites
Internet properties established in 2007